The 2016–17 KHL season was the ninth season of the Kontinental Hockey League. The season started on 22 August 2016 and ended on 16 April 2017. SKA Saint Petersburg defeated Metallurg Magnitogorsk four games to one to win their second Gagarin Cup Championship in three seasons.

The KHL had the third highest average attendance in Europe, averaging 6,121 spectators, and the highest total attendance in Europe with 5.32 million spectators in the regular season.

Team changes
The Chinese club HC Kunlun Red Star from Beijing, China joined the league, to become its 29th team.

The Russian Club Metallurg Novokuznetsk was relegated due to debt.

Divisions and regular season format
Like in the 2015–16 season, each team played every other team once at home and once on the road, giving a total of 56 games (28 at home, 28 on the road), plus 4 additional games (2 at home, 2 on the road) played by each team against rival clubs from its own conference. Thus, each team played a total of 60 games in the regular season.

How the teams are divided into divisions and conferences is shown in the table below.

League standings

Western Conference

Eastern Conference

Gagarin Cup Playoffs

The playoffs started on 21 February 2017, with the top eight teams from each of the conferences and end with the last game of the Gagarin Cup final on 16 April 2017.

Final standings

Player statistics

Scoring leaders

  
As of 18 February 2017

Source: KHL

Leading goaltenders

As of 18 February 2017

Source: KHL

Awards

Players of the Month
Best KHL players of each month.

Milestones

References

External links
 Season schedule 2016–17

 
Kontinental Hockey League seasons
KHL
KHL
KHL
KHL